Harbinger is an adventure role-playing video game by American studio Silverback Entertainment published in 2003 by DreamCatcher Interactive. Harbinger takes place on a massive space ship inhabited by multiple warring races and a band of refugees. The player has the choice of three characters with their own unique quests, items, and full-game storylines.

References

External links 
 

Role-playing video games
Action role-playing video games
Video games developed in the United States
Video games with isometric graphics
Windows games
Windows-only games
2003 video games
DreamCatcher Interactive games